Aziz Mukasa, popularly known by his stage name Aziz Azion (pronounced [ʕaziːz] á-ʐðɲ), is a Ugandan R&B singer-songwriter and musician. He was born Aziz Mukasa on 27 July 1986 in Fort Portal, Uganda and raised in Kampala where he studied up to Senior 4 and he made his move into the music industry. Popularly known as "the guitar emperor", Aziz has graced the Ugandan and East African music charts with the songs 'Yegwe', 'Nkumila Omukwano', 'Nakupenda', 'Oxygen', 'Beera Nange', 'Nzikiriza', 'Pain Killer', and 'Yo Love', among others. Popular music promoter and veteran disc spinner DJ Erycom while appearing on a TV Show, he said that "Leero Monday" was the very first song composed and sung by Aziz Azion in the year 2007.

Music style and career
Aziz music takes on the R&B music style with noticeable influences from Afrobeat and Afropop. He is currently signed to Shotym Music Entertainment, his own music label which he founded in 2020 with a goal of taking his music career to the next level. He learned how to play the guitar in 1998 in a local Kadongo Kamu band called 'Makuge Kandongo Kamu group'.
He later joined late Paulo Kafeero's group called Kulabako Guitar Singer, where he spent one year and a half before moving to Kato Lubwama’s Diamond Productions for two years.
He then joined Eagles’ production where he spent a couple of months before he and his bandmates agreed to form a band that would play for all artists thus the formation of Jeckaki Band. Aziz backed up instrumentally in the band where he was a back up guitarist for a number of big names in music such as Jose Chameleon. Their first international stage performance was in 2005 during Chameleon's European tour. Jeckaki performed with Jose Chameleon in Sweden, Denmark, Norway, Belgium and Finland.

However, his music breakthrough came in 2008 following the release of his hit single, 'Nkumila Omukwano'. The singer has collaborated with artists like GNL Zamba on the R&B/Hip hop-driven 'Nakupenda', which was featured on his "Wampisa" album, Juliana, Goodlyfe, Mariam Ndagire, GNL, Swangz Avenue, Rabadaba and Pastor Wilson Bugembe.

Oxygen album
In 2011, Azion released his second music album Oxygen at Kati Kati, Calendar Rest Hotel, and KK beach. The album included songs like Oxygen and Baliwa.

Discography
 Nkumila Omukwano
 My Oxygen
 Uganda the pearl of africa
 Wampisa

Studio albums

Wampisa
My Oxygen
Beera Nange
Nakupenda

Music Award
2011 – PAM Awards – Best R&B Artiste

See also

 List of Ugandan musicians

References

1984 births
Living people
21st-century Ugandan male singers
People from Kabarole District
Ugandan rhythm and blues singers
People from Kampala
Ugandan singer-songwriters